Carroll County–Tolson Airport  is a county–owned, public-use airport located one nautical mile (1.85 km) southeast of the central business district of Carrollton, a village in Carroll County, Ohio, United States. It is owned by the Carroll County Airport Authority. According to the FAA's National Plan of Integrated Airport Systems for 2009–2013, it is categorized as a general aviation airport.

Although many U.S. airports use the same three-letter location identifier for the FAA and IATA, this airport is assigned TSO by the FAA and no designation from the IATA (which assigned TSO to Tresco Heliport in Tresco, Isles of Scilly, United Kingdom).

Facilities and aircraft 
It has one runway designated 7/25 with an asphalt surface measuring 4,300 by 75 feet (1,311 x 23 m).

For the 12-month period ending May 23, 2007, the airport had 34,950 aircraft operations, an average of 95 per day: 98% general aviation, 1% air taxi, and <1% military.
At that time there were 17 aircraft based at this airport: 88% single-engine and 12% multi-engine.

References

External links 
 Aerial image as of 14 April 1994 from USGS The National Map
 

Airports in Ohio
Buildings and structures in Carroll County, Ohio
Transportation in Carroll County, Ohio